Bostall Heath and Woods is an area of 159.1 hectares of woodland with areas of heathland located in the Royal Borough of Greenwich ward of Abbey Wood and adjacent to Lesnes Abbey Woods. The area to the south of the A206 (Bostall Hill) is Bostall Woods and to the north is Bostall Heath. The wood is owned and maintained by the Royal Borough of Greenwich, with the exception of the Cooperative Woods, in the north east corner of the site which in 1978 was gifted to the newly formed Bexley and Greenwich Community Hospice   by the local community owned Royal Arsenal Co-operative Society founded and based at that time just a short journey away serving locals and workers at the royal arsenal. Unlike Woodlands Farm, a community inner city farm which preserve ancient woodlands and rolling Kent field, the land at Bostall is no longer owned by the consumer owned the co-operative group co-op based in Manchester. The farm and a few residual tracts of ornamental verges between the homes and streets built below bostall woods and named by that society over a century ago remain the last historically significant landholdings of what had been one of Kent's largest and longest lasting employers. The woods, community housing, parks and amenities remain as a lasting investment in the Bostall Woods, and Abbey Woods community of Abbey wood, South London. <Ref name="hospicehistory">  [/ref]

Sport and recreation facilities
On Bostall Heath there are a bowling green, cricket nets and casual soccer facilities. It is part of the Green Chain Walk network.

Access
Bostall Heath and Woods is located within a mostly residential area and is accessible to the public from a number of points at all times. There are also public transport links. The nearest railway station is Abbey Wood railway station, the heath is served by buses B11 and 99 and the wood by B11, 99, 177, 180, 96, and 422.

References

External links
Friends of Bostall Heath and Woods
Dartford Orienteering Klubb's page on Bostall Woods
www.greenchain.com

Parks and open spaces in the Royal Borough of Greenwich
Walking in London
Forests and woodlands of London
Ancient woods of London
Geography of the Royal Borough of Greenwich
Common land in London